Luka Igrutinović (born 15 February 1992) is a Serbian professional basketball player for Joker.

Career achievements
 Bosnian League champion: 1  (with Zrinjski: 2017–18)
 Slovak Basketball League champion: 1 (with MBK Rieker Komarno: 2014-15) 
 Best scorer Slovak Basketball League (2014-15) 
 Best scorer 2015–16 National Basketball League (Czech Republic) season

External links 
 Profile at eurobasket.com
 Profile at realgm.com

1992 births
Living people
Basketball League of Serbia players
BC Prievidza players
KK Bosna Royal players
KK Napredak Kruševac players
KK Proleter Zrenjanin players
KK Spartak Subotica players
KK Joker players
KK Sloga players
KK Superfund players
BKK Radnički players
BK Patrioti Levice players
Serbian expatriate basketball people in Bosnia and Herzegovina
Serbian expatriate basketball people in the Czech Republic
Serbian expatriate basketball people in Slovakia
Serbian expatriate basketball people in Slovenia
Serbian men's basketball players
Sportspeople from Kragujevac
Point guards